Arthur Davison Ficke (November 10, 1883 – November 30, 1945) was an American poet, playwright, and expert of Japanese art. Ficke had a national reputation as "a poet's poet", and "one of America's most expert sonneteers". Under the alias Anne Knish, Ficke co-authored Spectra (1916). Intended as a spoof of the experimental verse which was fashionable at the time, the collection of strange poems unexpectedly caused a sensation among modernist critics which eclipsed Ficke's recognition as a traditional prose stylist. Ficke is also known for his relationship with poet Edna St. Vincent Millay.

After several years of illness, Ficke committed suicide in 1945.

Biography
A native of Davenport, Iowa, Ficke is associated with other local writers known as the Davenport group. His work was influenced by Japanese artistic traditions, which he had been familiar with since childhood; his father, an art dealer, imported Japanese art in the last decade of the nineteenth century, when it was extremely popular. Ficke wrote several popular treatises on Japanese art during his career, among them Chats on Japanese Prints, published in 1915.

Sticking to traditional styles and forms when modernism was dominating the world of literature and poets were prone to experimentation, Ficke was noted for being "in the best sense a conservative force in our poetry." Much of his early work was in traditional meter and rhyme scheme; Sonnets of a Portrait-Painter (1914) is a noteworthy example.

Ficke was displeased by what he saw as the inaesthetic nature of contemporary experimentation, which was the main motivation for the Spectra hoax, intended as a satire of modern poetry. His collaborators on the Spectra hoax were fellow poets Witter Bynner (writing as 'Emanuel Morgan') and Marjorie Allen Seiffert (writing as 'Elijah Hay'). Ironically, his experience writing Spectra influenced him to begin experimenting with other forms; Christ in the Desert was his first more modernistic work, without traditional meter or rhyme scheme.

Partial bibliography
Poetry
(1907) From the Isles: A Series of Songs out of Greece
(1907) The Happy Princess, and Other Poems
(1908) The Earth Passion, Boundary, and Other Poems
(1910) Some Recent Poems of Note
(1914) Sonnets of a Portrait-Painter
(1915) The Man on the Hilltop, and Other Poems 
(1916) Spectra: A Book of Poetic Experiments; as Anne Knish, with Witter Bynner as Emanuel Morgan
(1917) An April Elegy
(1924) Out of Silence, and Other Poems
(1926) Selected Poems
(1927) Christ in China: A Poem
(1929) Mountain against Mountain
(1936) The Secret, and Other Poems
(1942) Tumultuous Shore, and Other Poems
Plays
(1910) The Breaking of Bonds: A Drama of the Social Unrest
(1913) Mr. Faust
(1930) The Road to the Mountain: A Lyrical Pageant in Three Acts
(1951) The Ghost of Sharaku 
Novels
(1939) Mrs. Morton of Mexico
Non-fiction
(1913) Twelve Japanese Painters [via HathiTrust]
(1915) Chats on Japanese Prints

Further reading
William Jay Smith, The Spectra Hoax. (Middletown, Connecticut: Wesleyan University Press, 1961)
Milford, Nancy, Savage Beauty: The Life of Edna St. Vincent Millay. (New York: Random House, 2002).
Meade, Marion, Bobbed Hair and Bathtub Gin: Writers Running Wild in the Twenties . (Mariner Books, 2005).

References

External links
 
 
 
 Biography and bibliography of Ficke by Poetry Foundation
 Twins in My Cradle: Arthur Davison Ficke, Iowa Poet
 Famous Iowans: Arthur Davison Ficke (Des Moines Register) 
 Japanese influences on Ficke's work
 Arthur Davison Ficke, themargins.net. A detailed bibliography of Ficke's main works
 1921 private letter to Ficke from Millay
 Arthur Davison Ficke Papers at Yale University Library

20th-century American poets
1883 births
1945 suicides
Writers from Davenport, Iowa
Poets from Iowa
20th-century American dramatists and playwrights
20th-century American novelists
Modernist theatre
Harvard University alumni
American male poets
American male novelists
American male dramatists and playwrights
20th-century American male writers
Novelists from Iowa
Suicides in New York (state)